Ochetophila is a genus of flowering plants in the family Rhamnaceae, native to Chile and Argentina. The species in this genus are actinorhizal plants.

Taxonomy

Species
Ochetophila comprises the following species:
 Ochetophila nana (Clos) Kellermann, Medan & Aagesen
 Ochetophila trinervis (Gillies ex Hook.) Poepp. ex Endl.

Species names with uncertain taxonomic status
The status of the following species and hybrids is unresolved:
 Ochetophila parvifolia Miers

References

Rhamnaceae genera
Rhamnaceae